Dąbrowa Górna may refer to the following places in Poland:
Dąbrowa Górna, Lower Silesian Voivodeship (south-west Poland)
Dąbrowa Górna, Świętokrzyskie Voivodeship (south-central Poland)